Psychological Review is a bimonthly peer-reviewed academic journal that covers psychological theory. It was established by James Mark Baldwin (Princeton University) and James McKeen Cattell (Columbia University) in 1894 as a publication vehicle for psychologists not connected with the laboratory of G. Stanley Hall (Clark University), who often published in his American Journal of Psychology. Psychological Review soon became the most prominent and influential psychology journal in North America, publishing important articles by William James, John Dewey, James Rowland Angell, and many others.

According to the Journal Citation Reports, the journal has a 2020 impact factor of 8.934.

The journal has implemented the Transparency and Openness Promotion guidelines that provide structure to research planning and reporting and aim to make research more transparent, accessible, and reproducible.

History
In the early years of the 20th century, Baldwin purchased Cattell's interest in the journal, but was forced to sell the journal to Howard Warren in 1908 when scandal forced him out of his professorship at Johns Hopkins University (where he had moved in 1903). Editorship of the journal fell to Baldwin's newly hired young colleague John B. Watson, who used the journal to advance his school of behaviorism. Psychological Review was eventually sold by Warren to the American Psychological Association, which has owned it ever since.

Editors-in-chief

The following persons are or have been editor-in-chief of the journal:

References

External links

Psychology journals
Publications established in 1894
English-language journals
Bimonthly journals
American Psychological Association academic journals
1894 establishments in New Jersey